Clavicula may refer to:

 Clavicle, a slender, S-shaped bone approximately 6 inches long bone that serves as a strut between the shoulder blade and the sternum
 Mappae clavicula, a medieval Latin text containing manufacturing recipes for crafts materials, including for metals, glass, mosaics, and dyes and tints for materials
 Clavicula Salomonis (disambiguation)

See also
 Clavis (disambiguation)
 Key (disambiguation)